The Anchorage Symphony Orchestra (ASO) is a professional symphony orchestra located in Anchorage, Alaska. Randall Craig Fleischer was the Music Director until his passing in 2020. Elizabeth Schulze is the current Artistic Advisor and Chief Conductor while the ASO searches for a new Music Director. Linn Weeda is the assistant director and conductor.

The Anchorage Symphony Orchestra was founded in 1946, more than a decade before Alaska became a state, by a consortium of like-minded musicians looking for a musical outlet. Their first program collaborated with the Anchorage Little Theatre for a production of Charles Dickens' A Christmas Carol. From their original size of 17, the ASO grew through the 1950s, hiring Peter Britch as conductor, and increasing to 32 members. Anchorage, however, continued to grow with the development of the City of Anchorage as the North Slope oil fields grew and with the continued military presence of Elmendorf Air Force Base, the ASO by the 1980s crossed the threshold as a semi-professional ensemble. Today the organization boasts of an endowment, a board of directors, and 80 audition-entranced musicians in its ranks. In 2001, the symphony garnered the Mayor's Arts Award for an Outstanding Arts Organization and the Governor's Arts Award for an Outstanding Arts Organization.

The Anchorage Symphony performs in the Alaska Center for the Performing Arts in downtown Anchorage.  Music educator Lorene Harrison worked with the ASO among other area arts organizations.

See also
Anchorage Youth Symphony
Juneau Symphony
Music of Alaska

References

External links
 

American orchestras
Musical groups established in 1946
Tourist attractions in Anchorage, Alaska
1946 establishments in Alaska
Orchestras based in Alaska
Film scores
Video game musicians
Native American musical groups

Musical groups from Anchorage, Alaska